Crenicichla missioneira is a species of cichlid native to South America. It is found in the Uruguay River drainage, in tributaries of the upper and middle Uruguay River basin.

References

missioneira
Taxa named by Carlos Alberto Santos de Lucena
Taxa named by Sven O. Kullander
Fish described in 1992